The Battle of Tsorona was an engagement between the Eritrean and the Ethiopian armies fought near the border town of Tsorona. Eritrean government statements identified Ethiopian armed forces as the aggressors and the Ethiopian government using a smokescreen of propaganda to justify the attack.

Background 
Relations between Eritrea and Ethiopia have been brittle and tensions between the two countries have remained high after both countries fought each other in the Eritrean–Ethiopian War which lasted from 1998 to 2000, and since the end of the war there have been a number of small border skirmishes between the two countries using small arms, however the 2016 engagement utilized "medium- and long-range artillery".

Battle

Eritrean claims 
According to the Eritrean Information Ministry, Ethiopian forces attacked Eritrean troops at Tsorona on Sunday, June 12, 2016. After an overnight battle, the troops were repelled on Monday, June 13, 2016. Ethiopian forces quickly withdrew back over the border, with Eritrea estimating Ethiopian losses at 200 dead and 300 wounded, Eritrea claims 18 losses during the battle.

Ethiopian claims 
Ethiopian government spokesman Getachew Reda initially denied any knowledge of clashes between Eritrea and Ethiopia. Subsequent comments by the Ethiopian government spokesman claimed "there were significant casualties on both sides."

References 

2016 in Eritrea
2016 in Ethiopia
Eritrea-Ethiopia border skirmish
Eritrean–Ethiopian border conflict
Eritrea-Ethiopia border skirmish